Matthew Gilmore (born 11 September 1972 in Ghent) is a Belgian-Australian retired track cyclist, who mostly competed and was most successful on track for Belgium. Although Gilmore was born in and represented Belgium, he is the son of Australian racing cyclist Graeme Gilmore and competed with an Australian licence earlier in his career, changing to Belgium on 15 June 1998. Gilmore is also the nephew of British racing cyclist Tom Simpson.

At the 2000 Sydney Olympics he won a silver medal in the men's madison event together with Etienne De Wilde.  That year, he rode for Danish road bicycle racing Memory Card–Jack & Jones.  Before that he rode for SPAR–RDM, and afterwards he changed to Vlaanderen–T Interim.

External links 
 

Belgian male cyclists
Cyclists at the 2000 Summer Olympics
Cyclists at the 2004 Summer Olympics
Olympic cyclists of Belgium
Sportspeople from Ghent
Cyclists from East Flanders
1972 births
Living people
Olympic medalists in cycling
UCI Track Cycling World Champions (men)
Medalists at the 2000 Summer Olympics
Olympic silver medalists for Belgium
Belgian track cyclists